Aetolus (Ancient Greek: Αἰτωλός Aitolos) was, in Greek mythology, a son of Endymion, great-great-grandson of Deucalion, and a Naiad nymph (Neis), or Iphianassa.

Family 
According to Pausanias, Aetolus' mother was called Asterodia, Chromia, or Hyperippe. He was married to Pronoe, by whom he had two sons, Pleuron and Calydon. His brothers were Paeon, Epeius, Eurycyda, and Naxos. In one account, Aetolus was the son of Protogenia by Zeus and the brother of Aethlius, Opus and possibly Dorus. Other sources also described Aetolus as the son of Amphictyon and father of Physcius, the father of Locrus. In this account, Aetolus was a king of Locris after his father Amphictyon. Then, the kingdom was passed on to Physcus and eventually Locrus who name the land after himself.

Mythology 
Aetolus' father compelled him and his two brothers Paeon and Epeius to decide by a contest at Olympia as to which of them was to succeed him in his kingdom of Elis. Epeius gained the victory, and occupied the throne after his father, and on his demise he was succeeded by Aetolus. During the funeral games which were celebrated in honor of Azan, he ran with his chariot over Apis, the son of Jason or Salmoneus, and killed him, whereupon he was expelled by the sons of Apis. The kingdom then passed to Eleius, son of his sister Eurycyda. After leaving Peloponnesus, he went to the country of the Curetes, between the Achelous and the Corinthian gulf, where he slew Dorus, Laodocus, and Polypoetes, the sons of Apollo and Phthia, and gave to the country the name of Aetolia. This story is only a mythical account of the colonization of Aetolia.

Genealogical tree

Notes

References 

 Apollodorus, The Library with an English Translation by Sir James George Frazer, F.B.A., F.R.S. in 2 Volumes, Cambridge, MA, Harvard University Press; London, William Heinemann Ltd. 1921. ISBN 0-674-99135-4. Online version at the Perseus Digital Library. Greek text available from the same website.
 Conon, Fifty Narrations, surviving as one-paragraph summaries in the Bibliotheca (Library) of Photius, Patriarch of Constantinople translated from the Greek by Brady Kiesling. Online version at the Topos Text Project.
 Gaius Julius Hyginus, Fabulae from The Myths of Hyginus translated and edited by Mary Grant. University of Kansas Publications in Humanistic Studies. Online version at the Topos Text Project.
Pausanias, Description of Greece with an English Translation by W.H.S. Jones, Litt.D., and H.A. Ormerod, M.A., in 4 Volumes. Cambridge, MA, Harvard University Press; London, William Heinemann Ltd. 1918. . Online version at the Perseus Digital Library
 Pausanias, Graeciae Descriptio. 3 vols. Leipzig, Teubner. 1903.  Greek text available at the Perseus Digital Library.
Stephanus of Byzantium, Stephani Byzantii Ethnicorum quae supersunt, edited by August Meineike (1790-1870), published 1849. A few entries from this important ancient handbook of place names have been translated by Brady Kiesling. Online version at the Topos Text Project.

Sources

Princes in Greek mythology
Kings in Greek mythology
Elean characters in Greek mythology
Aetolian mythology